Summit Fair is a 500,000 square foot open-air lifestyle center that opened in 2009. It is located in Lee's Summit, Missouri. It has approximately 50 shops.
The design of Summit Fair features a Main Street shopping area with beautiful landscaping and pedestrian walkways.

Anchors
Dick's Sporting Goods
DSW
JCPenney
Macy's (Closing 2022)

See also
Summit Woods Crossing

References

 http://www.bizjournals.com/kansascity/stories/2010/06/21/story8.html
 http://www.summitfairshopping.com/

Lee's Summit, Missouri
Shopping malls in Missouri
Shopping malls established in 2001
Buildings and structures in Jackson County, Missouri